The T&G Aviation DC-7 incident was a civil aviation disaster that occurred on Thursday 8 December 1988. Two DC-7 planes flying on a locust-control mission on  behalf of the United States Agency for International Development  were attacked en-route from Senegal to Morocco by POLISARIO troops who may have mistaken them for Moroccan military C-130 aircraft. 

Both planes were hit by 9K32 Strela-2 MANPADS missiles. One crashed, killing all 5 on board, the other managed to land despite losing an engine

Incident
In 1988, an American team was mobilized as part of a locust control mission in West Africa. On December 8 of the same year, two planes owned by T&G Aviation were commissioned by the United States Agency for International Development to spray the locusts. 
Taking off from Dakar-Yoff Airport  in Dakar, Senegal, their goal was to land at Agadir-Inezgane Airport in Agadir, Morocco, to support efforts against locust spread in the Souss region. 

Both Planes were following their flight plane on Airway Red 975 at an altitude of 11,000 feet and were flying 1.5 miles apart. The planes were attacked with 9K32 Strela-2 missiles by POLISARIO troops. The main aircraft (N284) lost an engine and a wing, and then crashed near the Moroccan Western Sahara Wall, killing all 5 crewmembers on board.  The other aircraft (N90804) lost an engine and a part of a wing but managed to land in Sidi Ifni. American sources stated that it is possible that the attackers mistook the planes for Moroccan military aircraft.

References

Accidents and incidents involving the Douglas DC-7
Aviation accidents and incidents in 1988
Aviation accidents and incidents in Morocco 
1988 in Morocco
1988 disasters in Morocco